USS Defender (MCM-2) was an  mine countermeasures ship in the service of the United States Navy. She entered service in September 1989 and was decommissioned in October 2014.

History 
It was laid down on 1 December 1983 at Marinette Marine Corp., Marinette, Wisconsin; launched on 4 April 1987; and commissioned on 30 September 1989. As of 1 July 2009, she was active in Mine Countermeasures Squadron Seven, U.S. Pacific Fleet, permanently forward deployed to Sasebo, Japan.

Defender was decommissioned at San Diego on 1 October 2014. As of 2019, she is in reserve as a part of the Pacific Reserve Fleet.

Systems 

Auxiliary systems: three Waukesha ship service diesel generator sets, one solar gas turbine generator, one omnithruster bow thruster system.

Electronic systems: one AN/SSN-2 Precise Integrated Navigation System (PINS), one AN/SQQ-32 Mine Hunting Sonar, one AN/SPS-55 Surface Radar, one AN/WSN-7 Gyro compass, Mine Countermeasure Equipment Suite, one AN/SLQ-48 (V) Mine Neutralization System, one AN/SQL-37 (V) 3 Magnetic/Acoustic Influence Minesweeping Gear, Oropesa type 0 size 1 Mechanical Sweep Equipment, MDG 1701 Marconi Magnetometer Degaussing System.

Operations 

For a review of current year-to-year operations of USS Defender), including operations after Hurricane Katrina, see:
 Index for Histories/Command Operations Reports submitted by Defender (MCM 2)
 Mine Warfare Ships Support Hurricane Katrina Recovery, Relief Efforts
 Defender Clears Way for Shipping off Gulf Coast (2005)

References

External links

 Ship's official site

Avenger-class mine countermeasures ships
Ships built by Marinette Marine
1987 ships
Minehunters of the United States